Amilton Jair Prado Barron (born 6 May 1979 in Lima, Peru) is a Peruvian soccer player who last played for León de Huánuco.

Club career
Admilton Prado debuted with Coronel Bolognesi in 1998.

International career
Prado has made 23 appearances for the Peru national football team.

References

External links

1979 births
Living people
Footballers from Lima
Association football defenders
Peruvian footballers
Peru international footballers
Coronel Bolognesi footballers
Sporting Cristal footballers
Sport Coopsol Trujillo footballers
Club Alianza Lima footballers
Sport Boys footballers
León de Huánuco footballers